Palpifer umbrinus is a moth of the family Hepialidae. It is found in India.

References

Moths described in 1879
Hepialidae